Frances Davies (18 October 1996) is a New Zealand field hockey player. She was first named to New Zealand women's national field hockey team in 2016. Her position is defender. Davies also plays for the Midlands hockey team.

Early life and education
Davies was born in Rotorua, New Zealand and was raised in Tauranga, New Zealand. She began playing field hockey at age six. At nine years old she played field hockey at Tauranga Girls' College alongside her future New Zealand national teammate Amy Robinson. Frances attended St. Peter's School in Cambridge, New Zealand.

Career
Davies was a member of New Zealand's field hockey team for the 2014 Summer Youth Olympic Games. After finishing her schooling, Davies moved to Auckland, New Zealand to further her field hockey career. Davies plays the position of defender. She played for New Zealand in the Under-21 Junior World Cup of field hockey. She was then named to the New Zealand women's national field hockey team, known as the Black Sticks, for a 2016 five-test series against Malaysia. Davies was again named to the Black Sticks in 2017. She was named to the Black Sticks team for the 2017 World League Final. Aside from playing for the national team, Davies is also a member of the Midlands, which as of 2017 were the national champions of New Zealand hockey.

References

New Zealand female field hockey players
1996 births
Field hockey players at the 2014 Summer Youth Olympics
Living people
Sportspeople from Rotorua
Commonwealth Games gold medallists for New Zealand
Field hockey players at the 2018 Commonwealth Games
Field hockey players at the 2022 Commonwealth Games
Commonwealth Games medallists in field hockey
Female field hockey defenders
Field hockey players at the 2020 Summer Olympics
Olympic field hockey players of New Zealand
20th-century New Zealand women
21st-century New Zealand women
Medallists at the 2018 Commonwealth Games